Gordon Blaine McTavish (1925 – February 21, 2019) was a Canadian curler and judge.

He wasn't a  champion like his other teammates, as he replaced Ron Braunstein at second position, who was a medical student at the time and had to miss the World championships that year.

In 1960–1961 he was a president of Granite Curling Club in Winnipeg.

Personal life
The Honourable Gordon McTavish served as a provincial court judge in Manitoba from 1971 to 1999. He was married to Milly Johnson and had two children. In addition to curling, he was involved in horse racing as an owner and judge. He graduated from Manitoba Law School and was called to the bar in 1961. He worked for the law firm Keith and Westbury before entering private practise. In 1965 he was appointed as justice of the peace for Fort Garry.

Teams

References

External links
 
Winnipeg Free Press Archives, Jan 24, 1963, p. 37 (look at "When Gordon McTavish curled in the first western")

1925 births
2019 deaths
Canadian male curlers
Canadian racehorse owners and breeders
Judges in Manitoba
Curlers from Winnipeg
University of Manitoba alumni